The Football Victoria Community Shield (formerly the Football Federation Victoria Community Shield) is the annual soccer match between the winners of the National Premier Leagues Victoria and the Dockerty Cup in the previous season. Serving as a "curtain raiser" in February ahead of the start of the season, it is considered to be a Super cup within the Victorian football league system.

Organised by Football Victoria, the FV Community Shield also has a focus on raising proceeds for various charity and community-based initiatives. The 2015 inaugural edition partnered with World Vision's "One Goal" program, whilst the 2019 edition was held in support of the #SaveHakeem campaign, seeking to free refugee and Pascoe Vale FC player Hakeem al-Araibi from detention in Thailand.

Men's event

History 
The FFV Community Shield was first announced in January 2015. The first match was held that year in support of World Vision's One Goal program, whose aims are to leverage the power of football to tackle malnutrition in Asia and Australia.

Past winners

Records 
 Most wins: 3, Bentleigh Greens
 Biggest win: 4–1 Heidelberg United vs Bentleigh Greens 16 February 2018
 Most consecutive wins: 2, Bentleigh Greens SC 2016–2017
 Most appearances in a final: 4, Bentleigh Greens

Women's event

History 
A women's FFV Community Shield commenced in 2017, featuring the winner of the Team App Cup and the NPL Victoria Women competition.

Past winners

Records 
 Most wins: 
 Biggest win: 
 Most appearances in a final:

References

Football in Victoria (Australia)